Corps of Invalids could refer to:

Corps of Invalids (Great Britain) (1688-1802)
The Corps of Invalids which formed part of the 1st American Regiment (1783–1784) in the Continental Army